This article contains two charts: The first chart is a list of the top 50 all-time scorers in the history of the National Basketball Association (NBA). The list includes only points scored in regular season games. The second chart is a progressive list of the leading all-time NBA scorers.  LeBron James is the leading scorer in NBA history.

Scoring leaders
The following is a list of National Basketball Association players by total career regular season points scored.
Statistics accurate as of March 16, 2023.

Progressive list of scoring leaders
This is a progressive list of scoring leaders showing how the record increased through the years.
Statistics accurate as of March 16, 2023.

See also
List of National Basketball Association annual scoring leaders
List of National Basketball Association career playoff scoring leaders
List of National Basketball Association career 3-point scoring leaders
List of National Basketball League (United States) scoring leaders
List of National Basketball Association single-game scoring leaders

Notes

References

External links
Basketball-Reference.com enumeration of NBA career leaders in points scored
National Basketball Association official website enumeration of NBA career leaders in points scored

National Basketball Association lists
National Basketball Association statistical leaders